Madina Town is a residential neighborhood in Faisalabad, Pakistan. 

It is located near Susan Road and is considered one of the posh parts of the city. It became a municipal administration area (town) in 2005. Madina town and Saeed colony No. 1 & 2 are urban areas of Madina town. 

Its main villages are Bhaiwala, Gatti, Manawala, and Dhuddi Wala. It is mainly situated between Canals 213/RB and 214/RB.

Education 
Majority of residents are well-educated and speak Punjabi but can also speak fluent Urdu and English as well. Madina Town is developing rapidly and a number of major schools and colleges of the city are located there. These include the following:

 Junior branch of Divisional Model College, Faisalabad
 Shibile College
 Faisalabad Grammar High School 
 Government School, Madina Town, Faisalabad 
 Government College Women University Faisalabad
 Government Islamia High School, Gatti
 Dar-e-Arqam School, Madina Town, Faisalabad

References

Tehsil municipal administrations of Faisalabad
Metropolitan areas of Pakistan